Filippo Iannone (born 13 December 1957) is an Italian prelate of the Catholic Church who has been president of the Pontifical Council for Legislative Texts since April 2018. He has been a bishop since 2001 and an archbishop since 2012. He is a member of the Carmelites.

Education and early career
Filippo Iannone was born on 13 December 1957 in Naples. On 1 August 1976, he entered the Carmelites. He was a novice at the San Martino ai Monti in Rome and then studied at the Santa Maria del Carmine in Naples. He later studied at the San Luigi Papal Theological Seminary of Southern Italy for his bachelor’s degree in theology and at the Pontifical Lateran University, where he earned a doctorate in civil and canon law. He took his first vows on 1 October 1977 and his final vows on 15 October 1980. He received his priestly ordination on 26 June 1982.

He was associate professor of canon law at the Pontifical Theological Faculty of Southern Italy and a visiting professor at several other institutions. Within the Carmelite order he worked in the regional Treasury Commissioner's office from 1985 to 1988 and for the national body from 1988 to 1991. From 1988 to 1994 he was President of the Commission for the Revision of the Constitution. For the Archdiocese of Naples, he held the position of Defender of the Faith in the Regional Court from 1987 to 1990; and Judicial vicar at the Naples Diocese Tribunal from 1990 to 1994. He was episcopal vicar for part of the Archdiocese from 1994 to 1996 and vicar general from 1996 to 2001.

Episcopal ministry 

On 12 April 2001, Iannone was appointed auxiliary bishop of the Archdiocese of Naples and titular bishop of Nebbi by Pope John Paul II. He received his episcopal ordination on 26 May 2001 from Cardinal Michele Giordano. At the time of his appointment, he was the youngest Italian bishop. As part of the reorganisation of the Archdiocese of Naples undertaken by Cardinal Crescenzio Sepe, he was nominated as Vicar General, co-ordinating with the clergy and ) (lit. "Court moderators") in matters of Church administration.

On 19 June 2009, Pope Benedict XVI named him Bishop of the Diocese of Sora-Cassino-Aquino-Pontecorvo.

On 31 January 2012, Pope Benedict named him vicegerent of the Diocese of Rome, elevating him to the rank of archbishop. His appointment to that position was requested by Cardinal Agostino Vallini, the pope's vicar for Rome, who had himself come to Rome from Naples and knew Iannone's work there.

As of December 2015, he is a member of the Supreme Tribunal of the Apostolic Signatura, a consultant to the Congregation for Institutes of Consecrated Life and Societies of Apostolic Life, a member of the Council for Legal Affairs of the Italian Episcopal Conference, and president of the Education and Culture Committee of the Lazio episcopal region.

On 11 November 2017, Pope Francis named him adjunct secretary of the Pontifical Council for Legislative Texts, the first to hold that title since 2000. On 7 April 2018, Pope Francis named him President of that body, which was unusual in that he was promoted above the Council's secretary, Archbishop Juan Ignacio Arrieta. On 5 December 2020, Pope Francis named him a member of the Congregation for the Causes of Saints.

References

External links 

 
 
 

Italian Roman Catholic archbishops
1957 births
Living people
Clergy from Naples
Pontifical Lateran University alumni
Officials of the Roman Curia